The flavescent bulbul (Pycnonotus flavescens) is a species of songbird in the bulbul family of passerine birds. Its name comes from flavescent, a yellowish colour. It is found in south-eastern Asia.

Taxonomy and systematics
Alternate names for the flavescent bulbul include Blyth's bulbul, flavescent green bulbul and round-tailed green bulbul.

Subspecies
Three subspecies are recognized:
 P. f. flavescens - Blyth, 1845: Found in north-eastern India, north-eastern Bangladesh and western Myanmar
 P. f. vividus - (Baker, ECS, 1917): Found in north-eastern Myanmar, southern China, Thailand and northern Indochina
 P. f. sordidus - (Robinson & Kloss, 1919): Found in southern Indochina

Distribution and habitat
The natural habitat of the flavescent bulbul is subtropical or tropical moist montane forests.

Gallery

References

External links
Images at ADW

flavescent bulbul
Birds of Northeast India
Birds of Southeast Asia
flavescent bulbul
flavescent bulbul
Articles containing video clips
Taxonomy articles created by Polbot